Lewis Miller may refer to:

Lewis Miller (folk artist) (1796–1882), Pennsylvania German folk artist
Lewis Miller (philanthropist) (1829–1899), Ohio businessman and philanthropist
Lewis Miller (Australian artist) (born 1959), Australian painter and visual artist
Lewis T. Miller (1787–1856), American politician in the Michigan House of Representatives
Lewis Miller (soccer) (born 2000), Australian footballer

See also
Louis E. Miller (1899–1952), U.S. Representative from Missouri